The Bowers Mansion, located between Reno and Carson City, Nevada, was built in 1863 by Lemuel "Sandy" Bowers and his wife, Eilley Orrum Bowers, and is a prime example of the homes built in Nevada by the new millionaires of the Comstock Lode mining boom.

History
The land originally was purchased in 1856 by Eilley and her second husband Alex Cowan, who returned to Utah a year later with other Mormon settlers. Eilley secured a divorce and moved to Gold Hill where she ran a boarding house and  took in washing. Some miners, unable to pay for lodging and laundry with cash, gave Eilley Orrum pieces of their mining claims in payment. Thus she acquired the mining claim which, together with that belonging to her third husband Sandy, became the source of their fortune.

The mansion was the fulfillment of Eilley's dreams of prestige and respectability. The mansion, designed by J. Neely Johnson, a builder and ex-governor of California, combined Georgian Revival and Italianate architectural styles. It was modeled after a design conceived by Eilley based on her recollection of elegant buildings in her native Scotland. Indeed, the Bowers employed stonecutters from Scotland for the construction of their new home, which eventually cost $300,000 to build, an exorbitant sum in the 1860s. Eilley and Sandy toured Europe from 1861 to 1863, purchasing furniture, statuary, paintings and other adornments for their home. Unfortunately, in 1874, Eilley Bowers 3rd and only living child, a daughter named Persia, died of a suspected erupted appendix at the age of 12. The first 2 children died in infancy.

Following the death of Sandy Bowers in 1868, Eilley fell on hard financial times. She generated income by renting out rooms in the mansion and hosting parties and picnics on the grounds. The mansion hosted a ball for the women's suffrage movement and was the location of the annual Miner's Ball. The period of 1873–75 was the height of the mansion's popularity.

However, this was not enough to overcome Eilley's debts and she finally lost her home to foreclosure in 1876. The mansion was abandoned by the time Henry Riter acquired it and operated it as a resort in 1903.

Today
The building is currently owned and operated by the Washoe County Parks Department. Some 500 Nevada families have donated period furniture housed in the mansion. The park blends the historical site with recreational facilities such as a spring-fed swimming pool, picnic areas, and a playground. Tours of the mansion are given in summer and autumn.

Hot springs
The thermal spring waters are 116 °F and are cooled to 83° in the pool.

References

External links

National Park Service information, includes visitation
Bowers Mansion Regional Park
A Guide to the Minute book of the Bowers Mansion Restoration Group, 99-24. Special Collections, University Libraries, University of Nevada, Reno.

Houses in Reno, Nevada
Houses on the National Register of Historic Places in Nevada
National Register of Historic Places in Reno, Nevada
Houses completed in 1863
Historic house museums in Nevada
Museums in Washoe County, Nevada
Georgian Revival architecture in Nevada
Italianate architecture in Nevada